Teslin Crossing is an unincorporated area in Yukon, Canada, located on the Teslin River about  north-northeast of Whitehorse.

See also
Teslin (disambiguation)

References

Unincorporated communities in Yukon